Slither may refer to:

 Slithering, a form of limbless terrestrial locomotion

Film and television
 Slither (1973 film), a comedy directed by Howard Zieff
 Slither (2006 film), a comedy horror film directed by James Gunn
 "Slither" (Sliders), an episode of Sliders
 "Slither" (Law & Order: Criminal Intent), an episode of Law & Order: Criminal Intent
 Slither (The Secret Circle), the 5th episode of the first season of the CW television series The Secret Circle

Comics and games
 Slither (comics), a fictional Marvel Comics mutant villain
 Slither, a 1982 arcade game, or its ColecoVision port
 Slither.io, a 2016 massively multiplayer browser game featuring snakes

Music
 Slither (album), a 2000 album by Earth Crisis
 "Slither" (song), a 2004 song by Velvet Revolver
 "Slither", a song by Metallica from ReLoad
 "Slither", a song by Opeth from Heritage

Other uses 
 Cold Slither
 Slitherlink, a logic puzzle developed by publisher Nikoli